In 1953, Billboard magazine published two charts specifically covering the top-performing songs in the United States in rhythm and blues and related African-American-oriented music genres: National Best Sellers and Most Played in Juke Boxes. The charts, based on sales in stores and plays in jukeboxes respectively, are considered part of the lineage of the magazine's multimetric R&B chart launched in 1958, which since 2005 has been published under the title Hot R&B/Hip Hop Songs.

In the issue of Billboard dated January 3, 1953, Eddie Boyd was at number one on the juke box chart with "Five Long Years" and Willie Mabon and his Combo topped the best sellers listing with "I Don't Know", both songs retaining their positions from the final week of 1952.  The year's longest-running number one on both charts was "Shake a Hand" by Faye Adams; on the best sellers chart it spent nine consecutive weeks in the top spot, and on the juke box listing it spent ten non-consecutive weeks at number one.  It was the first in a string of three consecutive number ones for the singer, but after 1957 she never charted again. In the early 1960s she turned to gospel music and reportedly refused to even talk about her secular recordings.  Although "Shake a Hand" had the highest total number of weeks atop the juke box chart, the longest unbroken run at number one on that listing was achieved by Mabon's "I Don't Know", which spent six consecutive weeks in the peak position in January and February.

Among the other acts to top the chart for the first time in 1953 was Willie Mae "Big Mama" Thornton, who reached number one on both listings with "Hound Dog", the only charting single of her career.  The song would later be covered by Elvis Presley, whose version became a multi-million seller.  Although less well known, Thornton's original recording is regarded as highly influential; its accolades include being inducted into the Grammy Hall of Fame and being selected for preservation in the National Recording Registry by the Library of Congress as being "culturally, historically, or artistically significant".  Four other acts gained their first number ones in 1953, including the acts with the final number one of the year on each chart: Big Joe Turner with "Honey Hush" on the juke box chart and Clyde McPhatter and the Drifters on the best sellers listing.  Adams reached number one with "Shake a Hand", the first chart entry of her career.  The "5" Royales achieved the same feat, topping both charts in February with "Baby Don't Do It"; the group returned to number one on both listings in June with "Help Me Somebody".  This gave the Royales the distinction of having gained two number ones with their first two charting songs, but they would not achieve another chart-topper.

Chart history

a.  Two songs tied for number one on the juke box chart in this issue.

References

Works cited

1953
1953 record charts
1953 in American music